Saint-Clément-les-Places is a commune in the Rhône department in eastern France.

See also
Communes of the Rhône department

References

Communes of Rhône (department)